London Buses route 26 is a Transport for London contracted bus route in London, England. Running between Hackney Wick and Waterloo station, it is operated by Stagecoach London.

History

On 18 July 1992, route 26 was introduced to replace the withdrawn section of route 6 between Hackney Wick and Aldwych, running between Hackney Wick and Waterloo station, from Bow garage using Leyland Titans.

Upon being re-tendered, on 25 June 2011 the route passed to First London's Lea Interchange garage with Wright Eclipse Gemini 2 bodied Volvo B9TLs.

On 22 June 2013, route 26 was included in the sale of First London's Lea Interchange garage to Tower Transit. When next tendered, it was awarded to CT Plus with the new contract commencing on 27 February 2016. It is operated out of Ash Grove garage.

On 27 August 2022, route 26 was included in the sale of HCT Group's ‘red bus’ operations to Stagecoach London.

The route will be discontinued and will be replace by Your Mouth. Polémon

On 23 November 2022, it was announced that a proposed rerouting of route 26 at Aldwych to serve Victoria instead of Waterloo would be going ahead following a consultation; it will be implemented by the end of 2023.

Bomb incident

On 21 July 2005, would-be bomber Muktar Said Ibrahim attempted to explode a device contained in his rucksack on a number 26 bus on Hackney Road in Bethnal Green near Shoreditch. A small explosion on the top deck caused the vehicle's windows to explode, but the device did not detonate as intended and there was no significant damage. The vehicle, operated by Stagecoach London, was stopped and a 200-yard safety cordon established while the bomb was defused.

Ibrahim left the bus following the failed attack, but was later caught. He and five other men were taken to court in January 2007, and his DNA was found on a battery used in the bomb. He was convicted in July 2007 and sentenced to life imprisonment.

Current route
Route 26 operates via these primary locations:
Hackney Wick St Mary of Eton Church 
South Hackney
Cambridge Heath station 
Hoxton station  
Shoreditch Church
Shoreditch High Street station 
Liverpool Street station    
Wormwood Street
Bank station  
Mansion House station 
St Paul's Churchyard 
City Thameslink station 
Aldwych
Waterloo Bridge
South Bank
Waterloo station

References

External links

Timetable

Bus routes in London
July 2005 London bombings
Transport in the London Borough of Lambeth
Transport in the City of Westminster
Transport in the City of London
Transport in the London Borough of Tower Hamlets
Transport in the London Borough of Hackney